Charbonnet is a surname. Notable people with the name include:

Alice Charbonnet-Kellermann (1858–1914), French-Australian composer
Desiree Charbonnet (born 1968), American judge and politician
Pierre N. Charbonnet Jr. (1922–2005), U.S. Navy vice admiral
Zach Charbonnet (born 2001), American football player